The Village Inn, also known as the Davis Tavern, is located at the corner of Water and Main Streets in the borough of Englishtown in Monmouth County, New Jersey. The oldest section of the building dates to 1732. It was documented by the Historic American Buildings Survey in 1936, with addendum in 1984. The tavern was added to the National Register of Historic Places on November 13, 1972, for its significance in architecture and military history.

History and description
In 1727, Robert Newell purchased , including the site of the house. In 1749, Thomas Davis purchased , including the house, from Newell. By 1755, the house is expanded. In 1762, Thomas Davis sells the house to his son, Moses Davis, who later operates it as a tavern. In 1777, the tavern was sold to Daniel Herbert.

During the American Revolutionary War, it was George Washington's Headquarters. Here, on June 30, 1778, Washington started the court-martial of General Charles Lee, for his actions during the Battle of Monmouth.

In 1978, it was sold to the Battleground Historical Society.

See also
National Register of Historic Places listings in Monmouth County, New Jersey
List of Washington's Headquarters during the Revolutionary War

References

External links
 

Village Inn (Official Website)

Hotel buildings on the National Register of Historic Places in New Jersey
Hotel buildings completed in 1732
Buildings and structures in Monmouth County, New Jersey
National Register of Historic Places in Monmouth County, New Jersey
Englishtown, New Jersey
Historic American Buildings Survey in New Jersey
New Jersey Register of Historic Places
1732 establishments in New Jersey